Bacqueville-en-Caux (literally Bacqueville in Caux) is a commune in the Seine-Maritime department in the Normandy region in northern France.

Geography

Population

History
The Baskervilles in England come from this village, called sometimes Baskervilla, Bascervilla in ancient records. (Fictional references include the Hound of the Baskervilles by Sir Arthur Conan Doyle and William of Baskerville in The Name of the Rose by Umberto Eco.) Robert de Bascheville or de Baskeville received lands in Herefordshire after the Battle of Hastings and he held Eardisley Castle in that county.

Heraldry

Places of interest
 The church of St. Pierre, dating from the sixteenth century
 The twentieth century war memorial
 Two 13th-century stone crosses
 The church of St. Eutrope, dating from the nineteenth century
 The park and château of Bacqueville dating from the eighteenth century
 Two 16th century manorhouses
 A seventeenth century presbytery

See also
Communes of the Seine-Maritime department

References

Communes of Seine-Maritime